is a passenger railway station located in Tarumi-ku, Kobe, Hyōgo Prefecture, Japan, operated by the private Sanyo Electric Railway.

Lines

Station layout
The station consists of two unnumbered side platforms connected by an elevated station building. The station is unattended.

Platforms

Adjacent stations

|-
!colspan=5|Sanyo Electric Railway

History
It was renamed to its present name on August 1, 1935.

Passenger statistics
In fiscal 2018, the station was used by an average of 2567 passengers daily (boarding passengers only).

Surrounding area
 Tio Maiko
 JR Maiko Station
 Bridge Science Museum

See also
List of railway stations in Japan

References

External links

 Official website (Sanyo Electric Railway) 

Railway stations in Japan opened in 1914
Railway stations in Kobe